The 1895 Buffalo football team represented the University of Buffalo as an independent during the 1895 college football season. The team compiled a 1–4–2 record. Buffalo had no coach and played its home games at Olympic Park in Buffalo, New York.

Schedule

References

Buffalo
Buffalo Bulls football seasons
Buffalo football